Alphonse de Cailleux, in full Alexandre Achille Alphonse de Cailleux but numerous variations exist (31 December 1788 – 24 May 1876) was a painter, connoisseur and arts administrator who became director of the Musée du Louvre and all the royal museums of France. Under the Bourbon Restoration. he was attached to the reconstituted royal household (maison du roi).

Bibliography

Early life

Cailleux was born on 31 December 1788 in Rouen (Normandie, France).

Employment

As secrétaire général des Musées royaux, he shared a carriage with Charles Nodier, Jean Alaux and Victor Hugo at the coronation of Charles X in 1825. In 1836, he was appointed directeur adjoint at the Louvre, where he assisted the increasingly debilitated Louis Nicolas Philippe Auguste de Forbin. Upon Forbin's death he was appointed directeur général des beaux-arts, a precursor of the position of Minister of Fine Arts.

In 1845, he was elected a membre libre (not being an artist himself) of the Académie des Beaux-Arts of the Institut de France. As revolt erupted and Louis Philippe abdicated in February 1848, Cailleux, a confirmed royalist, resigned his posts.

Death

On 24 May 1876, Cailleux died in Paris (Île-de-France, France).

Awards

He was a Knight of the Legion of Honour, but was promoted to Officer by decree on 17 May 1826. His portrait, attributed to Georges Rouget, is at the Musée de Versailles.

Notes

French art critics
Directors of the Louvre
Artists from Rouen
1788 births
1876 deaths
Chevaliers of the Légion d'honneur
Members of the Académie des beaux-arts
French male non-fiction writers